The Malcolm X House, also known as the Wilfred and Ruth Little House, is a private house located at 4336 Williams Street in Inkster, Michigan. It is significant for its association with African American Civil Rights leader Malcolm X, who lived here with his brother Wilfred Little in 1952-53. The building was listed in the National Register of Historic Places in 2021.

History
This house was built in 1950, and was first owned by Wilfred Little (Wilfred X) and his wife Ruth. Wilfred had joined the Nation of Islam in the 1940s, and by 1950 he was identified as a spokesman for Temple No. 1 in Detroit. In 1952, he helped facilitate the parole of his younger brother, Malcolm, and welcomed him into his house. Malcolm joined his brother at Temple No. 1, and soon visited the Honorable
Elijah Muhammad, who formally assigned him the "X." In 1953 he was named Assistant Minister of Temple No. 1, and by late 1953 he was sent to other Temples around the country, ending his permanent residence here. He would, however, visit his brother occasionally over the years until his assassination.

The house was eventually abandoned. As of 2021, it is being rehabilitated by the nonprofit organization We Hope, Dream, and Believe, which wants to turn the house into a historical landmark and community center.

Description
The Malcolm X House is a one-and-a-half-story, side-gable  seven room, minimalist modern house built in 1950. It is built of wood, and is nearly identical to some other houses nearby which were built around the same time. The front is asymmetrical, with an entrance door flanked by two window openings. An offset cross-gable is set to one side. The house sits on a concrete foundation.

References

External links
We Hope, Dream, and Believe

National Register of Historic Places in Wayne County, Michigan